Super-rotation can mean:

 Atmospheric super-rotation, in which a planet's atmosphere rotates faster than the planet's surface
 Inner core super-rotation, in which a planet's inner core rotates faster than the planet's surface